Gláuber Vian Corrêa  (born 9 February 1981), also known as  Gláuber , is a Brazilian footballer who played with Akratitos and with Pogoń Szczecin.

Club career
Gláuber previously played for Guarani and Fortaleza in the Campeonato Brasileiro Série A. He played with Akratitos for one season in the Greek Super League. He also had a brief spell with Pogoń Szczecin, but did not appear in any league matches.

References

1981 births
Living people
People from Ilha Solteira
Brazilian footballers
Brazilian expatriate footballers
União Agrícola Barbarense Futebol Clube players
Guarani FC players
Fortaleza Esporte Clube players
Sport Club do Recife players
Clube Atlético Juventus players
América Futebol Clube (SP) players
A.P.O. Akratitos Ano Liosia players
Pogoń Szczecin players
Expatriate footballers in Greece
Brazilian expatriate sportspeople in Poland
Expatriate footballers in Poland
Association football defenders
Footballers from São Paulo (state)